Torleif Erik Oskar Ericson, born November 2, 1930 in Lund, is a Swedish nuclear theoretical physicist. He is known for 'Ericson fluctuations' and the 'Ericson-Ericson Lorentz-Lorenz effect'. His research has nurtured the link between nuclear and particle physics.

Biography

Career 
Ericson studied physics at Lund University, from where he obtained his PhD, under the supervision of Ben Mottelson at the Nordic Institute for Theoretical Physics (Nordita), in 1958. 

Ericson held positions as a postdoctoral researcher and an instructor at MIT and as Visiting scientist at Berkeley from 1959 to 1960. 

Following he joined CERN’s Theory Division, first as a fellow, and then as a staff member in 1962. He was recruited by the Director-General, V. F. Weisskopf, as the theoretical interface between particle and nuclear physics. 

Sabbatical year 1969/70 at MIT.

Invited guest professor at Geneva, Lausanne, Louvain, Tokyo and Uppsala. 

Adjunct professor at Uppsala University from 1993 within the framework of CERN's collaboration with Member States.

Official retirement from CERN in 1995, but still emeritus.

Research contributions 
Moving from MIT to Berkeley he wrote two papers in which he predicted what later became known as 'Ericson fluctuations' and today is considered a prime example of quantum chaos. Initially the idea was met with resistance. However, the prediction stimulated in a large number of nuclear reaction studies, as reviewed a few years later with Mayer-Kuckuk, and Ericson continued to develop the consequences in depth in a series of articles.

In 1963, Ericson, after an initiative by A. de-Shalit and V.F. Weisskopf, organised an international conference on high-energy physics and nuclear structure. The meeting turned out to be of significant importance both for Ericson's own career and the development of this scientific area. The conference series, later generally referred to as PANIC, was the start of the field interfacing nuclear and particle physics and has developed into a triennial event. The series is sponsored by the International Union of Pure and Applied Physics and has been going on since then.

Ericson, together with his wife Magda Ericson, were among the first to focus on the interaction of pions with nuclei and to study a regime that was intermediate between the low energies of traditional nuclear physics and elementary particles of higher energies. 

Ericson is also recognized for his elucidation of the pionic influence on the properties of the deuteron.

The activity on the interface between nuclear and particle physics led to that CERN set up various scientific committees, in which Ericson was deeply involved.

Administrative activities 
In his role as chairman of the Nuclear Structure Committee, Ericson proposed in 1964, to build an on-line isotope separator, which later has become known as ISOLDE. CERN eventually established  its  ultrarelativistic heavy-ion programme that over the years has attracted a large number of experimental physicists to the laboratory.

In addition to carry out his research, Ericson has taken on a series of managerial tasks. For several periods he filled the role as deputy leader for the CERN Theory Division, he chaired the CERN  Nuclear Structure Committee, served as a member of the CERN Physics III Committee, Swedish Program Committee for Physics and in the IUPAP body International Committee for High Intensity Accelerators (ICHIA). Furthermore, Ericson was associated editor in the journal Nuclear Physics A, with responsibility for intermediate energy, from 1976 to 2000. Since 1991 he is one of the general editors of the series Cambridge Monographs on Particle Physics, Nuclear Physics and Cosmology. Ericson has also been editor for a large number of conference proceedings.

Awards and honors 

 1976: Title of Professor (Swedish: Professors namn) awarded by the Government of Sweden
 1990: Foreign member of the Finnish Society of Sciences and Letters 
1990: Honorary professor, Shanghai Advanced Research Institute , Chinese Academy of Sciences 
 1993: Member of the Royal Swedish Academy of Sciences
1994: Member of the Royal Society of Sciences in Uppsala

Private life 
Ericson is married to the French physicist Magda Ericson since 1957. Together they have two adult children. The Ericsons reside in Geneva, Switzerland.

Bibliography

Books 
1991: The meson factories. Univ. California Press.
 1991: Piony i jadra. Moskva : Nauka, Russian translation of "Pions and nuclei" (1988).
 1988: Pions and nuclei. Clarendon Press.

Articles 

 Full list of articles indexed in Google Scholar, indexed in Inspire-HEP.

References

External links and further reading 

 Celebration in Honour of Magda and Torleif Ericson's 80th Birthday
 Festschrift for Torleif Ericson
 
 

People associated with CERN
1930 births
Living people
Members of the Royal Swedish Academy of Sciences
Lund University alumni
Swedish physicists